Hanna Pylväinen is an American novelist and educator. She is on the faculty at the Warren Wilson College MFA for Writers. She was formerly an assistant professor at Virginia Commonwealth University (VCU).

Life
Hanna Pylväinen grew up in suburban Detroit. Her family belonged to a conservative Finnish Lutheran church, a sect called Laestadianism. Pylväinen attended Mount Holyoke College and received a BA degree in 2007, and she received a MFA degree from the University of Michigan. She was a postgraduate Zell Fellow, awarded by the Zell Family Foundation. 

Her strict religious upbringing inspired her first novel, We Sinners, which follows the individual members of a large religious family as they grapple with their faith. Her writing has appeared in Harper's, The New York Times, The Wall Street Journal, and elsewhere.

Awards and honors
 2012, Whiting Award
 2014–2015, Princeton Arts Fellow

Work

References

External links

Profile at The Whiting Foundation
Interview about her book available on Youtube.

Year of birth missing (living people)
Living people
University of Michigan alumni
Mount Holyoke College alumni
American fiction writers

21st-century American women writers